Michael Vester (born 4 May 1988) is a Danish former professional footballer who played as a forward.

Career
Vester joined the AGF youth academy from TST Tilst, and was renowned as a goal scorer in his early career. He signed his first contract on 15 July 2003, keeping him at the club until 2006. 

He made his professional debut on 16 October 2005, coming on as a substitute in the 85th minute for Christer George in a 3–1 loss to OB in the Danish Superliga.

On 15 July 2010, Vester and AGF decided to terminate his contract by mutual consent. He joined Aarhus Fremad the same day.

References

External links
AGF profile
National team profile
Official Superliga stats

1988 births
Living people
Danish men's footballers
Denmark youth international footballers
Aarhus Gymnastikforening players
Aarhus Fremad players
Danish Superliga players
Denmark Series players
Association football forwards
Footballers from Aarhus